The Henry E. Dosch House is a house located in southwest Portland, Oregon listed on the National Register of Historic Places.

See also
 Henry E. Dosch
 National Register of Historic Places listings in Southwest Portland, Oregon

References

Further reading

Houses on the National Register of Historic Places in Portland, Oregon
1890 establishments in Oregon
Southwest Portland, Oregon
Portland Historic Landmarks